Carmen Mikiver (until 1989 Carmen Uibokant; born on 13 January 1964 in Tallinn) is an Estonian actress.

In 1989 she graduated from Tallinn Pedagogical Institute in theatrical directing speciality. 1987-1993 and 1996-1998 she worked at Estonian Drama Theatre. Since 2002 she is working at Endla Theatre. Besides theatrical roles she has also played on several films.

In 1989, she married actor Mikk Mikiver. The couple remained married until his death in 2006.

Selected filmography

 1986 Saja aasta pärast mais (role: Alissa) 
 1988 Varastatud kohtumine (role: Sirje)
 1988 Narva kosk (role: Siina Aunvärk)
 1990 Ystävät, toverit (Friends, Comrades) (role: Olga)
 1992 Armastuse lahinguväljad (role: Ilona)
 1994 Balti armastuslood (role: Ann)
 1993 Tear of the Prince of Darkness (role: Mimi)
 2005-2006, 2008–2009 Kodu keset linna (role: Heike)
 2008 Detsembrikuumus (role: Elsa Kingissepp)
 2010 Klass: Elu pärast (role: Karmen)
 2011-2013 Kättemaksukontor  (role:  Ivi Pihelgas)
 2013 Karikakramäng II: Hõbepulm (role: Raili)
 2015 The Fencer (role: Parent at meeting)
 2015-2016 Viimane võmm  (role: Rita Suviste)
 2017 Minu näoga onu  (role: Registrar)
 2018	Seltsimees laps (role: Hairdresser Carmen)
 2019 Johannes Pääsukese tõeline elu (role: Gyspy)
 2021 Sandra saab tööd (role: Investigator)
 2021: Firebird (role: Army Doctor)
 2022: Apteeker Melchior. Viirastus'' (role: Annlinn)

References

Living people
1964 births
Estonian stage actresses
Estonian film actresses
Estonian television actresses
20th-century Estonian actresses
21st-century Estonian actresses
Tallinn University alumni
Actresses from Tallinn